County Line Road may mean:

A road:
 County Line Road (Santa Clara–Stanislaus counties, California)
 Baseline Road (Colorado) also known as County Line Road (Adams-Weld)
 Florida State Road 852